Theophilus Carey Callicot (1826 – November 28, 1920) was an American lawyer, newspaper editor and politician.

Early life
He was born in Cornwall, England, and came with his parents to the United States as a child. The family settled at Fairfax, Virginia. He graduated from Delaware College, then studied law at Yale Law School and was admitted to the bar in New York City in 1847.

He lived with his wife Fitzina H. Callicot (1829–1867) at 158 High Street in Brooklyn at the time of the death of their one-year-old daughter Mary Fitzina in 1852. Later they had another daughter, Williamina Frederica (1854–1875).

In 1853, he published Hand-book of Universal Geography: Being a Gazetteer of the World (George P. Putnam & Co., 1853, 898 pages, on-line version).

State Assembly
He was a Democratic member of the New York State Assembly in 1860 (Kings Co., 3rd D.) and 1863 (Kings Co., 5th D.).

In 1860, during the debate of black suffrage, he told the Assembly that "the proposition to put Negroes on a footing of political equality with white men is repugnant to the sense of the American people. They will never consent to share the proud title of 'American citizen' with an inferior and abject race."

In March 1861, Callicot assisted Mitchell Sanford to defend Assemblyman Jay Gibbons at the latter's trial before the Assembly on charges of bribery. After Sanford's unexpected death on March 29, Callicot pleaded on behalf of Gibbons until the latter was expelled by the Assembly on April 3.

In 1863, the New York State Assembly was tied, having 64 Republicans and Democrats each. The election of a Speaker proved to be difficult. During the stalemate, Callicot offered the Republican leader Chauncey M. Depew a deal: If the Republicans elect him Speaker, then Callicot would help the Republicans elect a U.S. Senator from New York. Depew accepted, and on January 26, Callicot was elected Speaker on the 92nd ballot. Shortly afterward, the Democrats accused Callicot of improper and corrupt proceedings to achieve his election as Speaker and a Select Committee was appointed to investigate. On April 20, the Assembly adopted the majority report of the Select Committee, declaring Callicott "entirely innocent."

At the next state election he was defeated for re-election to the Assembly.

Federal office
In 1865, President Andrew Johnson appointed him Customs Collector at Brooklyn, New York. In 1868, he was accused of "traffic in illegal liquor", and convicted. He was fined $10,000
and sent to prison for two years. After serving out his term at Albany Penitentiary, he continued to be detained there because he did not pay the fine, and was released only after a presidential pardon in December 1870.

Newspaper editor
In 1890, he had been the editor of the Albany Evening Times in Albany, New York, for more than 15 years, when Governor David B. Hill transferred the State Printing from the Albany Argus, a pro-Cleveland paper, to Callicot's paper. As the editor, Callicot had "carried on the business of political assassination, abusing the best and lauding the worst men of the Democratic Party. He has used the knife and hatchet freely upon such Democrats as Samuel J. Tilden, Daniel Manning, the Cassidys, Governor Lucius Robinson and President Grover Cleveland."

In 1896, he became the editor of the Albany Argus.

Notes

Sources
 The transfer of the State printing contract, with Callicot's curriculum, in NYT on January 2, 1890.
 Proceedings in the case against Callicot and John S. Allen, in NYT on May 23, 1868.
Stamford Mirror Newspaper - June 30, 1896 Issue - Delaware County, NY at www.dcnyhistory.org Transcription of Stamford Mirror of Stamford, New York, edition of June 30, 1896, mentioning Callicot's takeover of the Argus.
 The papers of Isaiah Thornton Williams, at NY Public Library.
 Obit of daughter Mary Fitzina, in NYT on April 19, 1852.
Mr. Lincoln and New York at www.mrlincolnandnewyork.org Circumstances of his election as Speaker on Mr. Lincoln and New York.
 The end of the "Callicot Investigation", in NYT on April 18, 1863.
 Speaker election, in NYT on January 27, 1863.
 A Critical Dictionary of English Literature, and British and American Authors, Living and Deceased, from the Earliest Accounts to the Middle of the Nineteenth Century: Containing Thirty Thousand Biographies and Literary Notices, with Forty Indexes of Subjects compiled by Samuel Austin Allibone (page 148; Trübner & Co., 1859)
 Death notice in State Service: An Illustrated Monthly Magazine Devoted to the Government of the State of New York and Its Affairs ed. by James Malcolm (State Service Magazine Co., Inc.) [The site states it is a 1917 edition, but the text says: "...1863, fifty-seven years ago..." which dates the death in 1920. The 1917 year must be wrong anyway since he was alive in 1918 and sent a letter from Germany.]

External links
1918-01-27 T. C. Callicot, Democratic Assemblyman, 1918 letter. This is an original handwritten at www.immediateannuities.com facsimile of his letter to Robert Lansing from Wiesbaden in 1918, at Annuity Museum.

1826 births
1920 deaths
Speakers of the New York State Assembly
Democratic Party members of the New York State Assembly
Editors of New York (state) newspapers
University of Delaware alumni
Yale Law School alumni
British emigrants to the United States